History of European Jews in the Middle Ages covers Jewish history in the period from the 5th to the 15th century. During the course of this period, the Jewish population gradually shifted from their homeland in the Levant to Europe, primarily Central Europe dominated by the Holy Roman Empire (which gave birth to the Ashkenazi ethnicity of Jews) or Southern Europe dominated by the Iberian kingdoms (which gave birth to the Sephardic ethnicity of Jews).

Jewish tradition traces the origins of the Jews to the 12 Israelite tribes, however most Jewish traditions state that modern Jews descend from Judah, Benjamin and Levi. As early as the Babylonian exile Jews, through exile under military constraint or otherwise, came to live in many other Middle Eastern countries, and later formed communities throughout the eastern Mediterranean lands, constituting collectively a Jewish diaspora. Their presence is attested in Greece from the fourth century BCE onwards in places as varied as Chios, Aegina, Attica and Rhodes  and in Italy as early as the 2nd century BCE.

After the Siege of Jerusalem (70 CE), hundreds of thousands of Jews were taken as slaves to Rome, where they later immigrated to other European lands. The Jews who immigrated to Iberia, and their descendants comprise the Sephardic Jews, while those who immigrated to the German Rhineland and France comprise the Ashkenazi Jews. A significant depletion in their numbers in Western Europe began to take place with the rise of the Crusades, which brought about many pogroms and successive expulsion orders, in England (1290), France (14th century) and Spain (1492). With the end of the medieval age, a similar phenomenon was to repeat itself in the Italian peninsula and throughout most German towns and principalities in German-speaking lands in the sixteenth century. As a result, many Jews migrated to Eastern Europe, with large Yiddish speaking populations rising there over these same centuries. By the 17th century a trickle back process began, with reverse migration back to central and western Europe, following pogroms in Ukraine (1648–1649).

From the fall of Rome to the Late Middle Ages (500–1500)

Fall of Rome
The majority of archaeological and epigraphical evidence of the Jews in Late Ancient Rome lies in funerary sites, making it difficult to uncover a historical picture of their daily lives or their interactions with outsiders. After the decline of the Roman Empire, the Visigoths controlled large portions of former Roman territory, including southwestern Gaul until 507, and much of the Iberian peninsula until 711. At the start, Jewish communities generally flourished under Visigothic rule in both Gaul and Spain.

Visigoth Spain 

In 506, Alaric II decreed that Jews were to be considered Roman citizens and were to live under Roman law. They were given freedom to practice their religion, although efforts to convert pagans and Christians to Judaism were to be curtailed. Alaric also decreed that the judicial autonomy of the Jewish communities was to be respected. After Sisebut took the Visigothic throne in 612, these privileges were revoked, and suppression of the Jewish religion became policy, resulting in attempted forced conversion. There was a brief respite in 640, when Chindasuinth usurped the throne and pursued a pro-Jewish policy. His son Recceswinth, to the contrary, denounced Jews as "polluting the soil of Spain" in 653, and enacted a new code meant to make it impossible for Jews to remain in Spain. These laws proved to be unpopular, and were resisted by both Jews and Christians alike.  Despite these persecutions, Jews were able to help Muslim invaders capture Spain, ending Visigothic rule.

Activities 
The first historical testimonies on the activities of the Jews show that most were engaged in agriculture, and a minority were engaged in trade, as well as in handicrafts. In the South, "particularly in south Italy and Greece - the Jewish communities had almost a monopoly of dyeing and silk-weaving". Some were involved in qualified services such as interpreters, translators, and medical practitioners.

In the high middle ages, many European Jews were specialized as merchants, money-lenders or artisans, as they were largely excluded from crafts guilds and barred from owning land. In contrast, Julie L. Mell insists on the fact that much of the Jewish population was left at the lower end of the urban economic scale.

European Jews were involved in the intellectual and cultural spheres of Medieval society : "Jews contributed to medicine, astrology, mathematics as well as to the arts, literature and music."

Germany

Jewish migration from Roman Italy is considered the most likely source of the first Jews within German territory. While the date of the first settlement of Jews in the regions which the Romans called Germania Superior, Germania Inferior, and Magna Germania is not known, the first authentic documents relating to a large and well-organized Jewish community in these regions date from 321 and refers to Cologne on the Rhine. These documents stated that Jews could be called to the Curia and owed taxes to Rome, and that Jewish religious leaders were exempt from curial service, signalling that a uniquely Jewish community, prosperous enough to be taxed, had existed in Cologne for some time. During the Carolingian period, Jews had a vital function as importers of goods from the East, and their laws and customs were generally tolerated, although they were not allowed to proselytize to Christians. It was during this peaceful time, that Jews from other communities emigrated to Francia in hopes of better treatment, notably members of the Persian House of Exilarchs, such as Isaac the Jew and Makhir of Narbonne came to Francia and with them, brought a large community of Persian Jews, who later assimilated to European customs. However, these peaceful relations would end with the beginning of the First Crusade and thousands of Jews in communities all along the Rhine were attacked and killed under the presumption that if they were going to attack enemies of the Christ in Jerusalem, they should attack "Christ's enemies" around them in Germany, ushering in a lasting antisemitism that included pogroms, blood libel, and being blamed as the cause of catastrophes like the Black Death and the Mongol invasion of Europe. Despite those difficulties, German Jews continued to practice, refine, and evolve their religious and social customs, including the development of the Yiddish language and an identity as Ashkenazi Jews. They eventually established a uniquely Jewish occupation, working as Court Jews within the Holy Roman Empire.

Church laws in the Early Middle Ages
Conversions of Jews to Christianity, whether forced or voluntary, during the medieval period were an integral part of the life of Jewish communities in the medieval period. The pressures to convert, other than compulsory baptism to save one's life, could be theological, economic and intellectual. Voluntary conversion by such renegades (meshummadim) was motivated by a number of facts: a change of belief could account for the conversion, as could the desire to marry a Christian or to escape from the restrictions on life as a Jew, or to resecure a livelihood or home. Such conversions proved particularly devastating for the English and Spanish Jewish communities.

By the 10th century, most of Europe was under the rule of Christian monarchs who made Christianity the official religion of their realms. In the seriously diminished Roman or Byzantine Empire, Christianity had been the state church since the 380 Edict of Thessalonica. A privileged niche for Jews in the new order nonetheless remained. The Church forbade Christians from charging interest to fellow Christians; therefore the only source of loans were non-Christians such as Jews.  While this status did not always lead to peaceful conditions for the Jewish people, they were the most compatible non-Christians for the position due to their shared devotion to the same Abrahamic God that the Christians worshiped. While many Jews rose to prominence in these times, Judaism was mostly practiced in private to avoid persecution. The descendants of the survivors of this period, the Ashkenazi Jews, still commemorate some of the more memorable tragedies of this period in their liturgy.

Their fate in each particular country depended on the changing political conditions. In Italy (see History of the Jews in Italy) they experienced difficult days during the wars waged by the Heruli, Rugii, Ostrogoths, and Lombards. The severe laws of the Roman emperors were, in general, more mildly administered than elsewhere; the Arian confession, of which the Germanic conquerors of Italy were adherents, was characterized by its tolerance.

In other parts of western Europe, Jews who wished to remain true to the faith of their fathers were protected by the Church itself from compulsory conversion. There was no change in this policy even later, when the Pope called for the support of the Carolingians in protecting his ideal kingdom with their temporal power. Charlemagne, moreover, was glad to use the Church for the purpose of welding together the loosely connected elements of his kingdom when he transformed part of the old Roman empire into a new Christian one, and united under the imperial crown all the German races at that time.  Years after his death, in 843, his empire fell apart, and the rulers of Italy, France, and Germany were more attentive to the Church's desires in the making of laws dealing with the Jews.

In the wake of a narrow military defeat over Muslim forces, Leo III of Constantinople decided his nation's weakness lay in its heterogeneous population and began the forcible conversion of the Jews, as well as the New Christians. However, some were able to secretly continue their Jewish practices. In 1040, Rashi was born, and in the wake of the Norman conquest of England, Jews left Normandy to settle in London and other cities such as York, Norwich, Oxford, Bristol and Lincoln, where Pope Gregory VII prohibited Jews from holding offices in Christendom. Iban Iashufin, the King of the Almoravides, captured Granada and destroyed the Jewish community, as the survivors fled to Toledo. In 1095, Henry IV of Germany granted the Jews favorable conditions and issued a charter to the Jews and a decree against forced baptism. In 1171, after the birth of Rambam, Jews were accused of committing ritual murder and blood libel in the town of Blois. The adult Jews of the city were arrested and most were executed after refusing to convert. In 1210, a group of 300 French and English rabbis made aliyah and settled in Israel. During the Black Death, the clerics accused Jews of poisoning the wells of Europe to kill all the Christians.

Sicut Judaeis

Sicut Judaeis (the "Constitution for the Jews") was the official position of the papacy regarding Jews throughout the Middle Ages and later. The first bull was issued in about 1120 by Calixtus II, intended to protect Jews who were suffering during the First Crusade, and was reaffirmed by many popes, even until the 15th century. The bill forbade, besides other things, Christians from forcing Jews to convert, or to harm them, or to take their property, or to disturb the celebration of their festivals, or to interfere with their cemeteries, on pain of excommunication. Although the Jews and Christians of Rome were organized into distinct communities, the boundaries of which were not only reinforced on a daily basis but were regularly performed on ceremonial occasions such as the papal adventus, Jews and Christians experienced unusually robust cultural and social interactions, especially as the Jews increasingly aligned themselves with the protective power of the papacy.

However, despite the Church official position expressed in the Sicut Judaeis, the Church felt free to impose other restrictions and disabilities on Jews not inconsistent with the bull. For example, the Fourth Lateran Council in 1215 decreed that Jews be differentiated from others by their type of clothing or marking to avoid intercourse between Jews and Christians. Jews were sometimes required to wear a yellow badge or a pointed hat. Christian theologians began calling for the slavery of all Jews.

In 1229, King Henry III of England forced Jews to pay half the value of their property in taxes, following burning of the Talmud in Paris and the Tartars' capture of Jerusalem. During the Fatimid period, many Jewish officials served in the regime. King Henry III of England ordered Jewish worship in synagogue to be held quietly so that Christians passing by would not have to hear it, giving an order that Jews may not employ Christian nurses or maids, nor may any Jew prevent another from converting to Christianity. A few years later, French King Louis IX expelled the Jews from France, ending the Tosaphists period. Most Jews went to Germany and further east.

Later immigration to Germany
In 1267, the Vienna city council forced Jews to wear the Jewish hat, in addition to the yellow badge. Later in the century, a blood libel in Munich resulted in the deaths of 68 Jews, and an additional 180 Jews were burned alive at the synagogue, following another mob in Oberwesel, Germany. In 1290, owing to political pressure, English King Edward I expelled all Jews from England. They were only allowed to take what they could carry and most went to France, paying for their passage only to be robbed and cast overboard by the ship captains. Philip IV of France ordered all Jews expelled from France, with their property to be sold at public auction, and some 125,000 Jews were forced to leave. Similar to accusations made during the Black Plague, Jews were accused of encouraging lepers to poison Christian wells in France. An estimated five thousand Jews were killed before the king, Philip the Tall, admitted the Jews were innocent. Then, Charles IV expelled all French Jews without the one-year period he had promised them, as much of Europe blamed the Black Plague on the Jews and tortured them so they would confess that they poisoned the wells. Despite the pleas of innocence of Pope Clement VI, the accusations resulted in the destruction of over 60 large and 150 small Jewish communities.

In 1348, hundreds of Jews were burned and many were baptized in Basel.  The city's Christian residents converted the synagogue into a church and destroyed the Jewish cemetery there. Pope Clement VI issued an edict repudiating the libel against Jews, saying that they too were suffering from the Plague. In 1385, German Emperor Wenceslaus arrested Jews living in the Swabian League, a group of free cities in Germany, and confiscated their books. Later, he expelled the Jews of Strassburg after a community debate. In 1391, Ferrand Martinez, archdeacon of Ecija, began a campaign against Spanish Jewry, killing over 10,000 and destroying the Jewish quarter in Barcelona. The campaign quickly spread throughout Spain, except for Granada, and destroyed Jewish communities in Valencia and Palma De Majorca. King Pedro I ordered Spain not to harm the remaining Jews and that synagogues not be converted into churches. He then announced his compliance with the Bull of Pope Boniface IX, protecting Jews from baptism. He extended this edict to Spanish Jewish refugees. Benedict XIII banned the study of the Talmud in any form, as institutions forced Christian sermons and tried to restrict Jewish life completely, and a few years later Pope Martin V favorably reinstated old privileges of the Jews. After more Jews were expelled from France, some remained in Provence until 1500. In 1422, Pope Martin V issued a bull reminding Christians that Christianity was derived from Judaism and warned the Friars not to incite against the Jews, but the Bull was withdrawn the following year. By the end of the 15th century, the Inquisition was established in Spain. Around 1500 Jews found relative security and a renewal of prosperity in present-day Poland.

The Crusades

The trials the Jews periodically endured in the various Christian West kingdoms echoed the catastrophes that occurred during Crusades. In the First Crusade (1096) flourishing communities on the Rhine and the Danube were utterly destroyed. Furthermore, there were also attacks on the Jews that lived in cities along the Rhine.
Prior to these attacks, many Jews were seen as integral members of society despite religious differences. Many Jews worked in the money lending trade. Their services allowed for societies to function financially. In one case Jewish moneylenders were responsible for financially maintaining a monastery. Without these loans the monastery would have been unable to survive. However, this fiscal responsibility that the Jews carried might have caused tensions amongst the middle and upper class. These sects of society would not have approved of the power that the Jewish communities held. At this point there were no strictly Jewish communities. Jews were not concentrated in one area, rather their presence was spread over a larger geographical region.  Oftentimes a few families lived immersed in a predominantly Christian settlement. The Jewish families were comfortable in this setting and functioned successfully. In some circumstances, Christians both accepted and welcomed the Jews. When violence against the Jewish people began to occur some Christians attempted to protect their fellow neighbors. In the town of Cologne, Jews fled to the homes of their Christian neighbors where they were given shelter.  Christians discussed the topic of conversion with the Jews. There existed a theory that if the Jews were to convert to Christianity then they would no longer be the target of such violence. There were discussions regarding conversion to Christianity. Religious leaders including Bishops and Archbishops alike tried to spare the Jews from violence. One Archbishop from Mainz went so far as to offer monetary bribes to protect Jewish families.  These Jews did not want relief from the exile that occurred hundreds of years prior, moreover they saw the towns in which they had immigrated to as their homes. They were well received members of the community. In the Second Crusade (1147) the Jews in France suffered especially under Louis VII. Philip Augustus treated them with exceptional severity. In his days the Third Crusade took place (1188); and the preparations for it proved to be momentous for the English Jews. After being the victims of increasing oppression Jews were banished from England in 1290; and 365 years passed before they were allowed to settle again in the British Isles. The Jews were also subjected to attacks by the Shepherds' Crusades of 1251 and 1320.

Protection attempts by Christians during the First Crusade

During the First Crusade of 1096, there are documented accounts of Christian attempts to protect Jews from their violent attackers. The first of such attempts was carried out by the archbishop of Mainz, located in the Rhineland of Germany, in response to local Jews who had organized a bribe in return for the archbishop's protection. Although the archbishop at first accepted the bribe, community leaders persuaded him to protect the Jews' money instead of taking it, while still offering them refuge in his quarters. Ultimately, the archbishop's rescue attempt was unsuccessful. Crusaders, aided by some townspeople, eventually stormed the archbishop's chamber and slaughtered the Jews hiding there. 

In another instance, the bishop of Trier offered to keep Jews safe from Crusaders in his palace; however, local intimidation eventually forced him to abandon those whom he had previously aided. Because the bishop had no ancestry or allies in Trier, he felt that he could not muster the political power needed to carry out a successful resistance without the support of the townspeople. Instead, he offered the Jews an ultimatum: convert to Christianity or leave the palace. When doing so, he remarked, “You cannot be saved—Your God does not wish to save you now as he did in earlier days.”

In Cologne, Jews were protected by local gentiles after violence had broken out at the beginning of Shavuot, a Jewish holiday. During the two days of Shavuot, one Jewish woman was killed by Crusaders while venturing to the safety of a Christian neighbor's home, where her husband was waiting for her. However, the vast majority of Jews in Cologne survived Shavuot because local Christians had reached out and offered their homes as a means of asylum from the Crusaders.

Jewish-Christian relations

The relations of Jews and Christians were fraught with tensions about the death of Jesus and the Christian perception of Jewish obstinacy in refusing to accept the only faith the Christians knew in the world. The pressure on Jews to accept Christianity was intense. Recent years have seen a debate among historians on the nature of Jewish-Christian relations in medieval Europe. Traditionally, historians focused on the trials Jews had to endure in this period. Christian violence towards Jews was rife, as were ritual murder accusations, expulsions, and extortion. However, recently historians have begun to show evidence of other relationships between Jews and Christians, suggesting Jews were more embedded into Christian society than was previously thought.

Jonathan Elukin is one historian who thinks in this vein, as elucidated in his book Living Together, Living Apart. He shows that during the Crusades, some Jews were hidden and protected from being attacked by Christians. Some Jews worked in Christian villages. There were also several cases of conversion to Judaism as well as interfaith marriages.

One such case was Jacob ben Sullam, a Christian looking to become a part of Jewish society. He chose to "slaughter [himself]" of his Christian identity in the hope of being accepted as a Jew in the Jewish community.

As Christians sought conversion to Judaism, a number of Jews similarly wanted to convert to Christianity. For example, Herman, a Jew who adopted Christianity to the degree that his family worried that he would reject his Jewish heritage completely. Herman's conversion startled the rabbis and made them fear losing other Jews to Christianity.

The close bonds between Jewish and Christian neighbors led to Jewish communities thriving in some Christian cities. Jews experienced economic security and prosperity in their communities, even while enduring constant threats of violence. Though strict constraints were placed on Jews in the thirteenth century by the French monarchy, Jews continued to experience a stable living situation. Although the French monarchy prohibited the creation of Jewish religious centers, friendly relations with Christians enabled them to build a synagogue in Béziers in 1278. After being expelled from certain areas in Europe, Jews regularly returned to their old places of residence, if they had previously experienced a prosperous life there.

Another such historian is Ivan Marcus. The section of his book Cultures of the Jews, "Jewish-Christian Symbiosis" deals with the relationship between Christians and Ashkenazi Jews. Marcus claims that the time is written off as a time of intolerance against Jews living in Europe. For Marcus times of persecution were rarities and few and far between. The two communities lived amongst each other and interacted socially on an everyday basis. They interacted at such a personal level both Christian and Jewish leaders thought that the other group would heavily influence their respective faiths. When persecution did occur however it was only the more drastic measures that stopped the close interactions between the two groups. Had the intense violence described in other sources been the standard for living condition of the Askkenazi Jews then they would not have survived the era let alone their culture which is the roots for many Jews today.
During times of persecution against the Jews, chronicles show that Christian friends provided some of them aid and shelter. A chronicler tells a story of a Jewish woman who is given food and shelter for two days from a gentile acquaintance during a time of violence against the Jews during Shavuot. This gentile acquaintance is believed to be Christian. Also, the chronicles show that some Christians converted to Judaism during these times. Some converts even sacrificed themselves in order to show their loyalty to the Jewish community.

In England, many Jews worked and lived in small, mostly Christian towns. Historians interpret this as Jews feeling comfortable living and working in places surrounded by Christians. Another example some historians use to show Jewish attachment to their place in Western Christendom is the Jewish expulsion in France. After they were expelled in 1182, they returned in 1198.

Through some of the Christian world, Jews enjoyed privileges at the hands of nobles and even kings that were almost equal to the local Christians. For example, in the Crown of Aragon, in 1241, King James of Aragon issued a decree that the Jewish community of Barcelona would be given the right to elect members of the Jewish community to police itself and investigate Jewish criminals and crimes within the Jewish community. Once the elected police force caught a criminal, they were given the right to impose fines (paid to the crown, not the Jewish community), banish them from the Jewish quarter, or even banish them entirely from the city of Barcelona.  Further, these elected members were given the authority to judge cases between Jews in a court of law. In 1271, King James issued a similar decree with a sense of increased urgency which suggests that things had become volatile among the Jewish community, or that the perception of the Jewish community was overwhelmingly one of a state of chaos. This second decree also increased the rights of the council to whatever punishments they deem to be "convenient to the community," including any punishments that they deemed fit.

Even after multiple expulsions and persecutions, some Jews still returned to their hometowns. Once they returned, many prospered. In spite of royal restrictions attempting to limit their success. They built new synagogues.

These examples are used by some historians to shine a light on a more positive relationship between the two religious groups. These historians believe that these stories of aid, neighborliness, and prosperity are more notable and significant than previously recognized.

However, some historians do not agree with this view of history. Historian Daniel J. Lasker does not see the relationship of Christians and Jews in the same light. He contends that the expulsions Jews in Spain faced in 1492 were the product of the revolts seen a century earlier in 1391. Even though the relationship might have been positive, it ended on a negative note. The expulsions of the Jews in various regions is that ending, with a wide range of reasons behind them not just religion. The reason for the Jews returning to regions they were expelled from was not acceptance as to what happened, but a sense of comfort and familiarity. While Lasker acknowledges that Jews and Christians as having some positive relationships he does not want to write off the tension of the area.

Accusations of ritual murder, blood libel and host desecration

Although the first known mention of blood libel is found in the writings of Apion (30–20 BCE to 45 or 48 CE), who claimed that the Jews sacrificed Greeks in the Temple of Jerusalem, no other mention is recorded until the 12th century, when blood libels began to proliferate.

Jews were frequently accused of ritual murder and of using human blood (especially, the blood of Christian children) to make matzah. In many cases, these "blood libels" led to the Catholic Church regarding the victims as martyrs. The Catholic Church canonized children in over 20 such cases. England seems to have counted for the first and most important examples of these. The most influential and widely-known of these is Little Saint Hugh of Lincoln (d. 1255 and written about in Chaucer's "Canterbury Tales") and Simon of Trent (d. 1475). It gained particular currency because of the intervention of Henry III of England, who ordered the death of the Coping, the first to 'confess', and a further 91 Jews to be arrested, leading to 18 being executed. Nevertheless, the rest were released despite their conviction, after monks and his brother Richard interceded.

One example of Christian hostility towards Jews is the Accusation of Ritual Murder at Blois. The story follows a Jewish man and a Christian servant watering their horses at the same bend in a river. The Jewish man accidentally scared the Christian's horse with the white corner of his undershirt and the servant rode away, upset about the frightened beast, and told his master he saw the Jew throw a child in the river. The Christian master, who hated Jews, took this opportunity and had the Jew unlawfully accused of murder. The Christians took the man, along with the Jews who had tried to free him, beating and torturing them in the effort that they would abandon their religion. To no avail, the Jews were burned alive.

In some cases, the authorities spoke against the accusations, for example Pope Innocent III wrote in 1199:
No Christian shall do the Jews any personal injury, except in executing the judgments of a judge, or deprive them of their possessions, or change the rights and privileges which they have been accustomed to have. During the celebration of their festivals, no one shall disturb them by beating them with clubs or by throwing stones at them. No one shall compel them to render any services except those which they have been accustomed to render. And to prevent the baseness and avarice of wicked men we forbid anyone to deface or damage their cemeteries or to extort money from them by threatening to exhume the bodies of their dead.

The charge was circulated that they wished to dishonor the Host, which Roman Catholics believe is the body of Jesus Christ.

Black Death

When the Black Death raged through Europe (1346–53), the charge was given that the Jews had poisoned the wells.<ref>Jean de Venette, prior of a Carmelite convent in Paris in the 14th century, wrote:
As a result of this theory of infected water and air as the source of the plague the Jews were suddenly and violently charged with infecting wells and water and corrupting the air. The whole world rose up against them cruelly on this account. In Germany and other parts of the world where Jews lived, they were massacred and slaughtered by Christians, and many thousands were burned everywhere, indiscriminately. </blockquote></ref> The only court of appeal that regarded itself as their appointed protector, according to historical conceptions, was the "Holy Roman Emperor." The emperor, as legal successor to Titus, who had acquired the Jews for his special property through the destruction of the Temple in the year 70, claimed the rights of possession and protection over all the Jews in the former Roman empire.

Expulsions

In 1275, Edward I of England issued a decree forbidding Jews from lending money with interests, while allowing Jews to engage in craft, commerce and farming. The Jews, who were driven out of England in 1290, out of France in 1394, out of numerous districts of Germany, Italy, and the Balkan peninsula between 1200 and 1600, were scattered in all directions, and fled preferably to the new Slavic kingdoms, where for the time being other confessions were still tolerated. Most fled to Poland, as it had a reputation for religious tolerance unparalleled during this era. This religious tolerance may have also been a byproduct of the fact that Lithuania was the last country in Europe to become Christianized. Here they found a sure refuge under benevolent rulers and acquired a certain prosperity, in the enjoyment of which the study of the Talmud was followed with renewed vigor. Together with their faith, they took with them the German language and customs, which they then cultivated in a Slavic environment with unexampled faithfulness for centuries.

Spain 

As in Slavic countries, so also under Muslim rule, the persecuted Jews often found a humane reception, especially from the 8th century onward on the Iberian peninsula. But even as early as the 13th century the Arabs could no longer offer a real resistance to the advancing force of Christian kings; and with the fall of political power Arabic culture declined, after having been transmitted to the Occident at about the same period, chiefly through the Jews in the north of Spain and in the south of France. At that time there was no field of learning the Spanish Jews did not cultivate. They studied the secular sciences with the same zeal as the Bible and Talmud.

But the growing influence of the Church gradually crowded them out of this advantageous position. At first, the attempt was made to win them to Christianity through writings and religious disputations; and when these attempts failed they were ever more and more restricted in the exercise of their civil rights. Soon they were obliged to live in separate quarters of the cities and to wear humiliating badges on their clothing. Thereby they were made a prey to the scorn and hatred of their fellow citizens. In 1391, when a fanatical mob killed four thousand Jews in Seville alone, many in their fright sought refuge in baptism. And although they often continued to observe in secret the laws of their fathers the Inquisition soon rooted out these pretended Christians or Marranos. Thousands were thrown into prison, tortured, and burned, until a project was formed to sweep all Spain clean of unbelievers. The plan matured when in 1492 the last Moorish fortress fell into the hands of the Christians. Queen Isabella of Spain issued an edict banishing all Jews from Spain for acts of, ‘a serious a detestable crime,’ a reference to the purported ritual murder of the infant Christopher of La Guardia, which was tried in court in 1491, and who was later made into a Saint. Many of the Jews fled to the Balkan peninsula, where a few decades before Ottoman Turks had won a victory over the Cross. Sultan Bayazid II of the Ottoman Empire, learning about the expulsion of Jews from Spain, dispatched the Ottoman Navy to bring the Jews safely to Ottoman lands, mainly to the cities of Salonica (currently in Greece) and Smyrna (currently in Turkey). Judeo-Spanish also known as Ladino (a form of medieval Spanish influenced by Hebrew) was widely spoken amongst some of the Jewish communities in Europe since the 15th century.

Renaissance

Italy
Italian dukes in the Renaissance era accorded protections to resident Jewish communities for a range of political or economic reasons. However, the local authorities rigorously attempted to impose Jewish badges. Franciscan friars exerted pressure on the dukes to enforce the wearing of yellow badges by Jews which the dukes resisted. Taxation records reveal a great quantity of Jewish contribution to the duchy's finances. The Jewish tax contribution in the state budget was 0.2% in 1460. By 1480 this had increased to 1%. In 1482, 6% of the extraordinary tax came from Jewish communities. This evidence indicates the wealth of the Jewish population and also indicates a possible population boom. However, Jews lost support from Ludovico Sforza on the eve of the Italian wars.

Spain
There was no progress towards inter faith harmony in 15th century Spain. Mark Meyerson notes the silence of 15th century records on the Jewish-Christian relations in Morvedre. In that town Jews constituted a quarter of the urban population and had a significant contribution to the area's economy. The Jewish situation varied across Spain. The Jewish quarter of Cervera was sacked by Catalan troops and they warned Jews in Tarrega of the same fate. These events set off the emigration of affluent converso households from Barcelona. The situation was less severe for Jews and conversos in Aragon. In the kingdom of Aragon the strong Jewish ties to the monarchy, in the form of political support, revenue supplies and assistance, ensured their relatively safer position. The introduction of credit mechanisms by the Jews in Morvedre facilitated the Jewish revival in the region and granted the Jews dominance in the kingdom's credit markets. The Jewish community as a whole generally functioned with economic success. The Jewish economic activity was diversified not only in the kingdom of Valencia but also in the kingdom of Aragon. Jews continued lending sums to non-Jews and Jewish usury was no longer contested in public, and religious relations remained stable and unmarred by violent activity.

France
Jews enjoyed a time of prosperity until the end of the 15th century in Provence. There were no significant legal distinctions between the citizenship rights of Jews and Christians under the statutes of Marseilles. Jews were officially given the same citizenship rights in Saint-Remy-de-Provence in 1345 and by 1467 in Tarascon. Comtat Venaissin and Avignon, both being papal principalities, witnessed an era of peace for Jewish communities who were established there without expulsions being a part of their lives. The Jews of Provence received official protection but this was because of Jewish usefulness for the royalty. This did not, however, preclude anti-Jewish incidences which precipitated voluntary Jewish departures. Once Provence was annexed by the Kingdom of France in 1481, the flourishing Jewish residents found themselves expelled by 1498.

Enlightenment
According to most scholars, the Middle Ages ended around 1500–1550, giving way to the Early Modern Era, c. 1550–1789. The Enlightenment appeared at the end of the Early Modern Era, and was characterized by a set of values and ideas that completely opposed the previous Medieval age. The Enlightened Monarch was an important product of the era; he or she strove to create a cultured, modern state populated by effective subjects, and often began the journey to this state by improving the living conditions of the poor and minorities, which included Jews in most countries. The monarchs tried to include their Jewish subjects in mainstream society, reducing restrictions and passing more general laws that applied to all, regardless of religion.

A Jewish Enlightenment occurred alongside the broader European one, originally appearing at the end of the eighteenth century. Known as Haskalah, it would re-emerge in the 1820s and lasted for the better part of the century. A form of "critical rationalism" inspired by the European Enlightenment, Haskalah focused on reform in two specific areas: stimulating an internal rebirth of culture, and better preparing and training Jews to exist in a christocentric world. It did not force its adherents to sacrifice one identity for the other, allowing them to simultaneously be Jewish and emulate their Gentile contemporaries. One of the most important effects of the Enlightenment was emancipation for Jews. Beginning in Napoleonic France after the Revolution-which was directly inspired by the Enlightenment-Jews received full rights and became equal citizens. This trend spread eastward across the continent, lasting until 1917, when Russian Jews were finally emancipated during the first Russian Revolution.

See also
Medieval antisemitism
Golden age of Jewish culture in the Iberian Peninsula
History of the Jews in England (1066–1200)
History of the Jews under Muslim Rule
History of the Jews in the Ottoman Empire
History of the Jews in Poland before the 18th century

References

External links
 Church And The Jews In The Middle Ages
 Medieval Jewish History - Jews living under Islamic and Christian rule

Medieval Jewish history